The Red Bull RB1 is a Formula One racing car designed by Jaguar Racing for use in the 2005 season. However, with the Red Bull buyout of the Jaguar Racing team, it was used instead by Red Bull Racing.

Design 
The chassis was designed by Mark Smith, Rob Taylor and Ben Agathangelou and the car's engine was a Cosworth TJ2005  V10. The RB1 was the first car built by Red Bull Racing after the energy drinks manufacturer bought the Jaguar Racing team in 2004.

History 
Briton David Coulthard drove for the entire season, with Austrian Christian Klien and Italian Vitantonio Liuzzi sharing the other car. Liuzzi raced in four of the rounds, with Klien racing in the other 15 rounds. The team had two test drivers: American Scott Speed and Swiss driver Neel Jani.

The RB1's best result was a fourth-place finish on its debut at the 2005 Australian Grand Prix in Melbourne, and at the 2005 European Grand Prix held at the Nürburgring. Both results were achieved by David Coulthard. Christian Klien's best finish was fifth at the season finale in Shanghai. Vitantonio Liuzzi's best finish in the RB1 was eighth in his debut race, the 2005 San Marino Grand Prix at Imola.

The RB1's first race was the 2005 Australian Grand Prix and its final race was at the 2005 Chinese Grand Prix. The chassis was reused for the Toro Rosso STR1 in 2006.

The RB1 was featured in Episode 5 of Season 14 of Top Gear, where it was used by both Jeremy Clarkson and Coulthard for one of their car art projects. They started by shooting paintballs from the car's exhaust and one of the paintballs hits Clarkson in his nether region, causing the two to use an aluminium canvas instead. They later soaked the car in ultraviolet paint, which caused Coulthard's visor to be blurry.

Sponsorship and livery 
The basic color of the RB1 is dark blue. Large Red Bull sponsor stickers are placed on the vehicle. The Red Bull logo on the bonnet and the front wing, and the Red Bull lettering on the side pods. Another sponsor is tire supplier Michelin. 2005 Monaco Grand Prix both Red Bull cars ran with the Star Wars: Episode III – Revenge of the Sith livery and, for this race, the Red Bull pit crew dressed up as Imperial Stormtroopers.

The RB1 appeared in Episode 5 of Series 14 of Top Gear, in which the car was used for an ultraviolet paint scheme, with help from David Coulthard.

Media

Complete Formula One results
(key)

References

External links

2005 Formula One season cars
Red Bull RB01